Robert Patrick (born September 27, 1937) is an American playwright, poet, lyricist, short story writer, and novelist. He was born Robert Patrick O'Connor in Kilgore, Texas.

Early life

O'Connor was born to migrant workers in Texas. Because his parents constantly moved around the southwestern United States looking for work, he never went to one school for a full year until his senior year of high school, in Roswell, New Mexico. Books, film, and radio were the only constants in his early life. His mother made sure he learned to read, and arranged for him to start school a year early. He lacked friendships due to the constant moving, and didn't do well in school. He dropped out of college after two years. He did not experience live theater, beyond a few school productions, until he was working one summer as a dishwasher at the Kennebunkport Playhouse in Kennebunkport, Maine and fell in love with the theater.

He stopped in New York City on his way back to Roswell from Maine and happened upon the Caffe Cino, the first Off-Off Broadway theatre, on September 14, 1961. He stayed in New York, working for free at the Caffe Cino, La Mama ETC, and other early Off-Off Broadway theaters in any capacity, and supported himself with temporary typing jobs while observing and participating in dozens of productions, including Lanford Wilson's So Long at the Fair. He had already been writing poetry, and in 1964 wrote his first play, The Haunted Host. The play was soon produced at Caffe Cino, and playwriting became his main focus.

Career
Patrick has written and published over sixty plays.

1960s

His first play, The Haunted Host, premiered at Caffe Cino in 1964. Patrick denied Neil Flanagan, the Caffe Cino's star performer, the title role (because Flanagan had recently played Lanford Wilson's gay character, Lady Bright), and after other prominent Off-Off actors refused the role because they feared playing a gay character might damage their careers, Patrick appeared in the play himself alongside fellow playwright William M. Hoffman.

He also worked at La MaMa Experimental Theatre Club, another of the first Off-Off-Broadway theatres. Neil Flanagan directed a production of Patrick's play Mirage at La MaMa in July 1965. In November 1965, Patrick was production coordinator for BbAaNnGg, a benefit to raise money for electrical work at La MaMa's 122 Second Avenue theatre, which included plays, spoken word, performance art, and film by many prominent Off-Off artists.

In 1969, he won the Show Business magazine Best Play Award for Joyce Dynel, Salvation Army, and Fog. Also in 1969, his play Camera Obscura was produced on PBS, starring Marge Champion, and was chosen to be in the well-known playwright revue "Collision Course".

Patrick was a prolific pioneer in Off-Off-Broadway and gay theatre, with over 300 productions of his plays during the 1960s in New York City alone. In 1972, the publisher and licensing company Samuel French called Patrick "New York's Most-Produced Playwright".

1970s
Patrick directed a production of his own play, The Richest Girl in the World Finds Happiness, at La MaMa in 1970. He directed his own plays, Valentine Rainbow at La MaMa and The Golden Circle at 119 Spring Street, both in 1972.

He directed holiday shows at La MaMa in 1971, 1972, and 1974. The 1971 production was called La MaMa Christmas Show, the 1972 production was Play-by-Play, and the 1974 production was Play-by-Play: A Spectacle of Ourselves. In 1973, he directed Paul Foster's Silver Queen, which featured music by John Braden, at La MaMa.

In 1973, Patrick's Kennedy's Children had an obscure opening in the back of a London pub theatre called the King's Head, in Islington. The production was instantly successful and was signed for the West End and other international productions. 1974 was the first season of gay theatre in the United Kingdom, to which Patrick contributed three plays. His play Cleaning House was produced in California during the summer of 1974.

A 1974 Boston production of The Haunted Host was the first time Harvey Fierstein appeared on the professional stage as a man. Years later, Fierstein included a recording of Patrick's monologue "Pouf Positive" on his compact disc This Is Not Going to Be Pretty. "Pouf Positive" was also filmed by Dov Hechtman in 1989.

The 1975 Broadway production of Kennedy's Children earned Shirley Knight a 1976 Tony Award for Best Performance by a Featured Actress in a Play. She reprised her role in the 1979 CBS production of the play.

Patrick traveled widely, from Anchorage to Cape Town, to see productions of Kennedy's Children. For ten years, he visited high schools and high school theatre conventions nationwide on behalf of the International Thespian Society.

In 1976, Marlo Thomas commissioned Patrick to write My Cup Ranneth Over for her and Lily Tomlin. Although they never performed in the play, it would become Patrick's most produced work.

Patrick co-wrote Da Nutrcracker in Da Bronx with Jeannine O'Reilly and Paul Foster; the production was directed by Powell Shepard at La MaMa in 1977.

T-Shirts was first produced in 1979, starring Jack Wrangler, and was later chosen as the opening piece in the anthology Gay Plays: A First Collection.

1980s

Patrick directed The Richest Girl in the World Finds Happiness at La MaMa again in 1981. His Blue Is For Boys was the first play about gay teenagers, and the Manhattan borough president declared a Blue is for Boys Weekend in honor of the play in 1983 and again in 1986. The Trial of Socrates was the first gay play presented by New York. Hello Bob, an account of Patrick's experiences with the production of Kennedy's Children, was the last play he directed before leaving New York for California.

Later work
Other work by Patrick includes Untold Decades (1988), seven one-act plays giving a humorous and emotional history of gay life in the United States, and Temple Slave, a novel about the early days of Off-Off-Broadway and gay theatre. Patrick has also ghostwritten several screenplays for film and television; contributed poems and reviews to Playbill, FirstHand, and Adult Video News; and had his short stories published in anthologies.

Patrick has appeared in the documentaries Resident Alien, with Quentin Crisp, and Wrangler: Anatomy of an Icon, and in the videos O is for Orgy: The Sequel and O Boys: Parties, Porn, and Politics, both produced by the O Boys Network.

Most recently, he published his memoir Film Moi or Narcissus in the Dark and the plays Hollywood at Sunset and Michelangelo's Models. He retired from theatre in 1990, and has lived in Los Angeles since 1993.

In 2010, he published a DVD of his lecture "Caffe Cino: Birthplace of Gay Theatre" and two books of poems, A Strain of Laughter and Bitter with the Sweet, with Lulu.com. In 2013, he was brought back onto the stage by young Los Angeles underground theatre artists, appearing as a reader, singer, and actor. In March 2014, he gave a solo performance about his career entitled, "What Doesn't Kill Me Makes a Great Story Later," which featured a capella renditions of many of his original songs This was followed by two more solo evenings of song, entitled "Bob Capella" and "New Songs for Old Movies.".

Awards

Show Business (magazine) Best Play Award, 1969
Glasgow Citizens' Theatre Best World Playwrighting Award, 1973
International Thespian Society Founders Award for Services to Theatre and to Youth, 1980 (first openly gay recipient)
Blue is for Boys Weekends in the Borough of Manhattan, 1983 and 1986
Robert Chesley Award For Lifetime Achievement In Gay Playwrighting, 1996
West Hollywood Gay and Lesbian Advisory Board's Rainbow Key Award for having been instrumental in the beginnings of gay and Off-Off-Broadway theatre, 2008
New York Innovative Theatre Artistic Achievement Award, 2011
Charles Rodman Award for 50 Years of Service to Gay Theatre, 2014

Selected works

Plays

The Haunted Host (1964)
Joyce Dynel (1969)
Salvation Army (1969)
Fog (1969)
Camera Obscura (1969)
Pouf Positive
Kennedy's Children (1974)
One Man, One Woman
Play-By-Play

The Golden Circle
Tools Not Rules
My Cup Ranneth Over (1976)
T-Shirts (1979)
Mutual Benefit Life
Mercy Drop
Blue Is For Boys (1983)
Untold Decades (1988)
Michelangelo's Models

Bread Alone
The Trial of Socrates
Judas
The Trojan Women (after Euripides)The Last StrokeHello, BobEvan on Earth All at Sea (book and score)Hollywood at SunsetWhat Doesn't Kill Me Makes a Great Story Later (2013 - 2014)

Collections and anthologiesRobert Patrick's Cheap TheatricksMercy Drop and Other PlaysGay Plays: A First Collection (edited by William M. Hoffman; includes T-Shirts)Contra/DictionsThe Mammoth Book of Gay Short StoriesFlesh & the Word 2 & 3Best Gay Erotica (2009; 2010)Up by Wednesday (2014)Untold Decades: Seven Comedies of Gay RomancePoetry
"Benedicktion," published in RFD magazine #104

ScreenplaysGhost Story (television, 1972)High-Tide (television, 1990)Robin's Hoods (television, 1994)Delusion (film, 2004)
numerous ghostwritten works

Film and video rolesResident Alien (1990)O Is for Orgy: The SequelO Boys: Parties, Porn, and PoliticsWrangler: Anatomy of an Icon'' (2008)

References

External links

Robert Patrick papers, c. 1940-1984 Billy Rose Theatre Division, New York Public Library for the Performing Arts
RobertPatrick.WordPress.com 
Robert Patrick's life in pictures "Quit" (blog) July 2009
 76 pages of photographs and plays from Caffe Cino
 Robert Patrick's 2009 Village Voice interview about Caffe Cino Roy Edroso, April 2009
 
Robert Patrick 
Robert Patrick 
Patrick's page on La MaMa Archives Digital Collections

1937 births
Living people
People from Kilgore, Texas
American lyricists
20th-century American novelists
American male novelists
Novelists from Texas
American gay writers
American LGBT dramatists and playwrights
LGBT people from Texas
American LGBT poets
American LGBT novelists
20th-century American poets
20th-century American dramatists and playwrights
American male poets
American male dramatists and playwrights
Songwriters from Texas
20th-century American male writers
Gay poets